Neacomys dubosti, also known as Dubost's neacomys or Dubost's bristly mouse, is a species of South American rodent in the genus Neacomys of family Cricetidae. It is found in French Guiana, southeastern Suriname and nearby Amapá, Brazil. It was not recognized as distinct from N. guianae until 2001.

References

Musser, G.G. and Carleton, M.D. 2005. Superfamily Muroidea. Pp. 894–1531 in Wilson, D.E. and Reeder, D.M. (eds.). Mammal Species of the World: a taxonomic and geographic reference. 3rd ed. Baltimore: The Johns Hopkins University Press, 2 vols., 2142 pp. 
Patton, J. and Catzeflis, F. 2008. . In IUCN. IUCN Red List of Threatened Species. Version 2009.2. <www.iucnredlist.org>. Downloaded on December 2, 2009.

Mammals of Brazil
Mammals of French Guiana
Mammals of Suriname
Neacomys
Mammals described in 2001